Roger Ernest Strand (born April 4, 1948) was an American politician and farmer.

Strand was born in Morris, Minnesota and grew up in Cyrus, Minnesota. He graduated from Cyrus High School in 1966 and received his bachelor's degree in political science from University of Minnesota Morris in 1970. Strand went to Minnesota State University, Mankato for graduate school in public administration and constitutional law. He was a farmer. Strand served as court administrator for Traverse County, Minnesota and for Big Stone County, Minnesota. He served in the Minnesota Senate from 1977 to 1980 and was a Democrat. In 2005, Strand served on the Graceville, Minnesota City Council.

References

1948 births
Living people
People from Graceville, Minnesota
People from Morris, Minnesota
People from Pope County, Minnesota
Farmers from Minnesota
University of Minnesota Morris alumni
Minnesota State University, Mankato alumni
Minnesota city council members
Democratic Party Minnesota state senators